The 2005 Lexus Cup was the inaugural edition of the annual golf match competed by women representing Asia and an international squad. Each team was made up of twelve members. The competition took place at the Tanah Merah Country Club in Singapore from 9–11 December 2005. Lexus was he title sponsor while Rolex, DBS, Singapore Airlines, and Singapore Sports Council are main sponsors. The total purse was US$960,000, with $50,000 going to each member of the winning team and $30,000 to members of the other team.

The International team won solidly in the first annual event, 16 points to 8.

Teams
As in the similar team events of the Ryder Cup (USA vs. Europe men), Presidents Cup (USA vs. "International" men, i.e. rest of the world excluding Europe), and Solheim Cup (USA vs. Europe women), each team consisted of twelve players. Each captain appointed their remaining team members.

Asia
 Grace Park (captain) - Seoul, South Korea
 Meena Lee - Jeonju, South Korea
 Hee-Won Han - Seoul, South Korea
 Candie Kung - Kaohsiung, Taiwan
 Birdie Kim - Iksan, South Korea
 Jennifer Rosales - Manila, Philippines
 Jeong Jang - Daejeon, South Korea
 Hee Jung Park - Seoul, South Korea
 Aree Song - Bangkok, Thailand
 Naree Song - Bangkok, Thailand
 Namika Omata - Tokyo, Japan
 Riko Higashio - Fukuoka, Japan

International
 Annika Sörenstam (captain) - Stockholm, Sweden
 Paula Creamer - Mountain View, California
 Natalie Gulbis - Sacramento, California
 Karen Stupples - Dover, England
 Janice Moodie - Glasgow, Scotland
 Catriona Matthew - Edinburgh, Scotland
 Carin Koch - Kungalv, Sweden
 Sophie Gustafson - Särö, Sweden
 Erica Blasberg - Orange, California
 Jill McGill - Denver, Colorado
 Marisa Baena - Pereira, Colombia
 Suzann Pettersen - Oslo, Norway

Day one
9 December 2005

Day one saw six foursome matches where each team put two golfers on the course for each match, with the two playing alternate shots.  Asia won two early matches, but the Int'l team won the other four.

Day two
10 December 2005

The two teams matched up in four ball competition on day two.  The international team won three matches to one, with two others being halved, to give them an 8 to 4 lead going into Sunday's singles.

Day three
11 December 2005

On day three, the international team won 8 singles matches to 4, for a final margin of 16 to 8.

Golfer records

External links
Lexus Cup - official site
2005 Lexus Cup

Lexus Cup
Golf tournaments in Singapore
Lexus Cup
Lexus Cup